Varamin (also Romanized as Varāmīn and Verāmin) is a city in the Central District of Varamin County, Tehran province, Iran, and serves as capital of the county. At the 2006 census, its population was 208,569 in 53,639 households. The following census in 2011 counted 218,991 people in 62,884 households. The latest census in 2016 showed a population of 225,628 people in 69,190 households.

Etymology
The word "Varamin" has been recorded with the same spelling and pronunciation in Perso-arabic script since 3rd A.H. century. While its etymology is not clear, there have been many speculations which are almost all not more than guesses. The entry "Varām" in Burhan-i Qati is defined as:"... Things that are easy and light, and a city in Mulk-i Rayy that is known also as Varāmin."

The name has been transliterated in Latin scripts in many ways; such as Veramin, Veramine, Weramin, Weramine, Veraumin, and other variants, while Encyclopedia Iranica uses Varāmīn.

History
Until 1220s, Varamin was an agricultural center of Ray. The raiding of Ray by the invading Mongols caused a flux of migration and economical growth during Mongol Ilkhanid rule. Thus, Varamin developed into an urban center. A Vizier of Ilkhanid Abu Sa'id, named Yusuf Quhadhi built the Jameh Mosque of Varamin. Other significant monuments from this era, include mausoleum of Imamzadeh Yahya, Aladdin Tower, Imamzadeh Shah Husayn, and Sharif mosque. At the turn of 14th century, Varamin started to decline due to Timurid Empire armies' invasions. In 1405, Ruy González de Clavijo described the city as mostly deserted, although during early Timurid rule, a minor restoration was applied to the Jameh mosque and Imamzadeh Hosein Reza was built. By 16th century, Tehran started to grow as the major city of the region.

Landmarks

Ilkhanid architecture
During the Mongol Ilkhanate, as a result of the economic growth in the region, Varamin became an urban center and most of the significant historical monuments of this city belong to this period. Including:

Jameh mosque

The most famous building of the city, the Jameh mosque's construction began during Öljaitü's reign and completed in during his son's rule in 1322.

Aladdin tower

A cylindrical tomb with a conic dome was built in 1289 over a local ruler's grave.

Imamzadeh Yahya

The tomb of a descendant of the Muhammad in the city, famed for its tile-works. The tomb was constructed in 1307.

Others
Other than the three mentioned above, another tomb known as Shah Hoseyn was also built in Ilkhanid era. Portal of Masjid-i Sharif, which  does not exist nowadays is mentioned to be completed in 1307. An Ilkhanid graveyard was unearthed in 2016.

Other sites
Other than above buildings, mausoleums of Hosein Reza, Sakinehbanu, Kowkab a-ddin, Seyyed Fathollah, and Zaid Abolhassan are other historical monuments. Additionally, historians have mentioned the Razaviyeh historical madrasah adjacent to the Jameh Mosque, also Varamin Castle, 1500 feet from the Jameh Mosque, has also been a noted by travelers, both the madrasah and citadel do not also exist today.

Industries

Sugar refinery factory
Varamin Sugar Refinery Factory was built in 1934–1935 by Nikolai Markov and is the very first sugar refinery factory in Iran and Middle East. Since 2007 and privatization, its produce has been reduced because of shortage in ingredients.

Oil-extracting factory
Varamin Oil-extracting factory was built in 1938–1939 and is the first producer of vegetable oil in Iran.

Handcrafts

Carpets and rugs

Carpets and rugs of Varamin are among most famous carpets in the world. Many rug and carpet experts see Varamins as purer Persian carpets. They have geometric patterns with repeated medallions, especially on runners. They are made by tribal people who either live in or pass by Varamin.

Climate

Colleges and universities

Islamic Azad University
Islamic Azad University Varamin-Pishva Branch was established in 1985. This branch has more than 86 different majors and capacity of 15,000 students.

References 

Varamin County

 

Cities in Tehran Province

Populated places in Tehran Province

Populated places in Varamin County